Heikant is a small village in the former municipality of Boxmeer, in the Dutch province of North Brabant. It is located about 2 km north of Overloon. Since 2022 it has been part of the new municipality of Land van Cuijk.

Populated places in North Brabant
Geography of Land van Cuijk